A Stranger Came Home is a 1954 British film noir directed by Terence Fisher and starring Paulette Goddard, William Sylvester and Patrick Holt. The film was produced by Hammer Films at Bray Studios with sets designed by the art director J. Elder Wills. It is based on the 1946 novel Stranger at Home, which was credited to film actor George Sanders but was actually ghostwritten by Leigh Brackett. It was released in the United States by Lippert Pictures under the title The Unholy Four.

Plot
Four friends go on a fishing trip but only three return. After an absence of four years, during which time he had been an amnesiac, the fourth man, Philip Vickers, returns home after regaining his memory. He tells of a "friend" who knocked him out, drugged him, and left him to die. Any one of the remaining men could be a suspect as Job Crandall, Bill Saul and Harry Bryce have all been interested in Philip's attractive 'widow', Angie. Unfortunately, Philip's return coincides with a murder and he becomes the main suspect. Angie joins forces with her husband to help solve the mystery and clear his name.

Cast

 Paulette Goddard as Angie 
 William Sylvester as Philip Vickers 
 Patrick Holt as Job Crandall 
 Paul Carpenter as Bill Saul 
 Alvys Maben as Joan Merrill 
 Russell Napier as Inspector Treherne
 Kay Callard as Jenny
 Patricia Owens as Blonde
 David King-Wood as Sessions
 Jeremy Hawk as Police Sergeant Johnson

Production

Filming occurred at Bray Studios in Berkshire.

Critical reception
The New York Times wrote, "A THIRD-RATE British-made whodunit called The Unholy Four, featuring Paulette Goddard and a nondescript cast...A few more fly-by-nights like this Lippert presentation, produced and written by Michael Carreras, and the still-shapely Miss Goddard may find herself collecting the pieces of a career"; Leonard Maltin called it "Muddled"; whereas Allmovie called it a "suspenseful drama."

References

External links

 

1954 films
1954 crime drama films
British crime drama films
British black-and-white films
Film noir
Films based on British novels
Films directed by Terence Fisher
Hammer Film Productions films
Lippert Pictures films
Films shot at Bray Studios
1950s English-language films
1950s British films